Caldas Esporte Clube, better known simply as Caldas, is a Brazilian football club in the city of Caldas Novas, in the state of Goiás.

History
Founded on April 18, 1982 in the city of Paraúna in the state of Goiás, the club is affiliated to Federação Goiana de Futebol 
and Currently, the club disputes Campeonato Goiano (Third Division). In 1992, FGF held an intermediate competition called Campeonato Goiano (Intermediate Division). Caldas ended up being champion and won the right to dispute the first division of Goiano.

Titles
 Campeonato Goiano (Intermediate Division) (1992)

References 

Association football clubs established in 1982
Football clubs in Goiás